Warner is an English surname which was brought from the Norman French Warnier, and derived from the Old Norse Verner or Wærn. The name ultimately derived from the Germanic name Warinheri which composes of the elements warin meaning 'guard' and heri meaning 'army'. Notable people with this surname include the following:

Surname 
 Albert Warner (1883–1967), one of the founders of Warner Bros. Studios
 Albert Warner (umpire) (born 1921), South African cricket umpire
 Alexander Warner (1827–1914), American businessman and politician
 Alf Warner (born 1979), English footballer
 Amelia Warner (born 1982), British actress
 Amos Griswold Warner (1861–1900), an American social worker
 Andrew S. Warner (1819–1887), New York politician
 Annette Warner, German historian of ancient Egyptian mathematics
 Arthur Warner (1899–1966), English-born Australian businessman and politician
 Augustine Warner (1611–1674), Virginia colonial politician and farmer
 Augustine Warner Jr. (c. 1642 – 1681), Virginia colonial politician, Speaker of the Virginia House of Burgesses
 Bill Warner (American football) (1881–1944), American college football player and coach
 Bill Warner (motorcycle racer) (1969–2013), American motorcycle racer and land speed record holder
 Brian Warner (astronomer) (born 1939), British astronomer
 Brian Hugh Warner (born 1969), musician, author, and director better known by his stage name Marilyn Manson
 Carolyn Warner (1930–2018), American politician
 Charles Warner (1846–1909), English actor
 Charles Dudley Warner (1829–1900), American essayist and novelist
 Curt Warner (born 1961), American college and professional football running back
 Sir Courtenay Warner, 1st Baronet (1857–1934), politician in the United Kingdom
 Darius B. Warner, brigadier general in the American Civil War
 David Warner (disambiguation) or Dave Warner, several people
 Deborah Warner (born 1959), British director of theatre and opera
 Earle S. Warner (1880–1971), New York politician and judge
 Ed Warner (1889–1954), American baseball player
 Ed Warner (basketball) (1929–2002), American college basketball player
 Edward Warner (disambiguation), several people
 Emily Howell Warner (1939–2020), American aviator
 Ezra Warner (disambiguation), several people
 Frank Warner (disambiguation), several people
 Fred M. Warner (1865–1923), 26th governor of Michigan
 Frederick Warner (disambiguation), several people
 Fred Warner (American football) (born 1996), American football player
 Glenn Scobey Warner (Pop Warner) (1871–1954), American football coach
 Gordon Warner (1913–2010), American martial arts expert
 H. B. Warner (1875–1958), an English actor
 Hans Warner (1844–1896), American politician
 Harry Warner (disambiguation), several people
 Hiram B. Warner (1802–1881), Georgia politician
 Horace B. Warner (1876–1915), New York assemblyman
 Ivan Warner (1919–1994), New York politician and judge
 Jack Warner (disambiguation), several people
 Jackie Warner (disambiguation), several people
 John Warner (disambiguation), several people
 Kathleen Warner née Kathleen Davis (1903–1996), Trinidadian actress and radio personality
 Kenneth Warner (1891–1983), Bishop of Edinburgh
 Kurt Warner (born 1971), NFL quarterback 
 Larry Warner (1945–2022), American politician
 LeeAnna Warner (born 1998), American girl who disappeared in 2003
 Levinus Warner (1618–1665), orientalist
 Malcolm-Jamal Warner (born 1970), American actor, producer and director
 Mark Warner (born 1954), United States senator from Virginia and former governor of Virginia
 Marina Warner (born 1956), British novelist
 Oliver Warner (1903–1976), British naval historian and writer
 Owen Warner (born 1999), English actor
 Pelham Warner (Sir Pelham Francis "Plum" Warner, 1873–1963), English cricketer
 Peter Warner (1931–2021), Australian seafarer and ship's captain
 Rex Warner (1905–1986), English classicist, writer and translator
 Ron Warner (baseball) (born 1968), American baseball coach
 Ross Warner (disambiguation), several people
 Sam Warner (1887–1927), one of the founders of Warner Bros. Studios
 Samuel Warner (disambiguation), several people
 Seth Warner (1743–1784), huntsman
 Susan Warner (1819–1885), American writer of religious fiction for young people
 Sylvia Townsend Warner (1893–1978), English novelist and poet
 Thomas Warner (disambiguation), several people
 Valentine Warner (born 1972), chef and presenter
 Volney F. Warner (1926–2019), retired U.S. Army general
 William Warner (disambiguation), several people
 Worcester Reed Warner (1846–1929), American mechanical engineer

See also

English-language surnames